Magda Ilands (born 16 January 1950, in Leuven, Flemish Brabant) is a former long-distance runner from Belgium, who represented her native country at the 1988 Summer Olympics. She won the 1985 edition of the Berlin Marathon.

Achievements

References
 

1950 births
Living people
Belgian female long-distance runners
Athletes (track and field) at the 1988 Summer Olympics
Olympic athletes of Belgium
Sportspeople from Leuven
World Athletics Championships athletes for Belgium
Belgian female marathon runners